Anton Polyakov (11 November 1987 – 8 October 2021) was a Ukrainian politician. A member of the party Servant of the People (until December 2019), he served in the Verkhovna Rada from 2019 to 2021. He died from coronary heart disease on 8 October 2021, at the age of 33. Alcohol and methadone were found in Anton's blood. Verkhovna Rada deputy Anna Skorokhod said that Anton Polyakov was murdered.

References

1987 births
2021 deaths
People from Chernihiv
21st-century Ukrainian politicians
Servant of the People (political party) politicians
Ninth convocation members of the Verkhovna Rada
Deaths from coronary artery disease